Tetragma gei is a moth of the family Prodoxidae. It is found in herb-rich steppe and forest openings in Washington, Idaho, Wyoming and South Dakota.

The wingspan is 11–17 mm. Adults are almost entirely pale ochreous or creamy white. Females possess an elongated, telescoping abdomen used to reach in the deeply recessed ovaries of the host plant.

The larvae feed on Geum triflorum. Young larvae feed inside the developing seeds.

References

Prodoxidae
Monotypic moth genera
Adeloidea genera
Moths of North America
Taxa named by Donald R. Davis (entomologist)